The 8th Tactical Operational Missile Brigade (Brigada 8 Rachete Operativ Tactice "Alexandru Ioan Cuza"), former 8th LAROM Brigade,  is a Multiple Rocket Launcher brigade of the Romanian Land Forces. It was formed 1 July 1916 as the 2nd Heavy Artillery Brigade, and was named after the Romanian Domnitor and politician Alexandru Ioan Cuza in 2010.

The Brigade is subordinated to the General Staff of the Romanian Land Forces and has its headquarters in Focșani. The high professionalism of the personnel in this unit is the reason why a large number of soldiers in the brigade were, or still are present in various theaters of operations, such as Bosnia and Herzegovina, Afghanistan, and Iraq. Since October 2004, there are no more conscripts in the structures subordinated to the Brigade; all the personnel is professional.

World War I
During World War I and World War II, the 8th Mixed Artillery Brigade was designated as the 2nd Heavy Artillery Brigade with its main subordinated units being the 1st and 5th Heavy Artillery Regiments. The 1st regiment participated in the Battle of Mărășești, while the 5th regiment took part in the Battle of Turtucaia.

World War II
During World War II, both the 1st and 5th regiments were part of the Romanian forces that fought at the Siege of Odessa in 1941; the 5th regiment's cannons were the first Romanian Army's cannons to hit Odessa. The 1st regiment also participated in the Battle of Stalingrad (starting with October 1942), and in the Battle of Budapest in 1945.

Organization 2020
 8th Mixed Artillery Brigade "Alexandru Ioan Cuza", in Focșani
 81st Multiple Rocket Launcher Battalion "Maior Gheorghe Șonțu", in Focșani
  83rd Multiple Rocket Launcher Battalion "Bogdan I", in Bârlad
  96th Multiple Rocket Launcher Battalion "Mircea Voievod", in Ploiești
  84th Data Acquisition Battalion "Mărăști", in Focșani
  85th Logistic Support Battalion "General Mihail Cerchez", in Bârlad

Equipment

 LAROM multiple rocket launchers
 M142 HIMARS multiple rocket launchers
 Other supporting/transport vehicles

References

External links
   Official Site of the Romanian Land Forces
  Official Site of the 8th LAROM Brigade

Brigades of Romania
Military units and formations established in 1916
Artillery units and formations of Romania